Wartberg may refer to:

 Wartberg ob der Aist, municipality in Austria
 Wartberg an der Krems, municipality in Austria
 Wartberg im Mürztal, municipality in Austria
 the German name for Senec, Slovakia
 Wartberg (Niedenstein), a mountain of Schwalm-Eder-Kreis, Hesse, Germany
 Wartberg (Stuttgart), a mountain of Baden-Württemberg, Germany
 Wartberg (Heilbronn), a mountain of Baden-Württemberg, Germany
 Wartberg culture, aka Wartberg group

See also
Wartburg (disambiguation)